Pedro Isidro (born 17 July 1985) is a Portuguese race walker. He competed in the 50 km event at the 2012 and 2016 Olympics and finished 39th and 33rd, respectively.

Competition record

References

1985 births
Living people
Portuguese male racewalkers
Olympic athletes of Portugal
Athletes (track and field) at the 2012 Summer Olympics
Athletes (track and field) at the 2016 Summer Olympics
World Athletics Championships athletes for Portugal
S.L. Benfica athletes
Sportspeople from Lisbon District